London Buses route 394 is a Transport for London contracted bus route in London, England. Running between Homerton University Hospital and Islington, it is operated by Stagecoach London.

History

Route 394 originally commenced operating on 15 September 2001 as the Shoreditch Hoppa under a London Service Permit. It was developed to address the lack of public transport running east to west across Shoreditch and funded as part of the New Deal for Communities (NDC). The NDC appointed Hackney Community Transport to run the service following a competitive tendering process.

The service initially ran at a half-hourly frequency between Tolpuddle Street in Islington and Broadway Market. It was operated with two Renault minibuses in a unique blue livery and served several roads with no other bus routes. Passenger numbers rose rapidly to 2,200 per week and Transport for London agreed to integrate the Shoreditch Hoppa into the mainstream London Buses network, with a route number and inclusion on network maps.

Transport for London awarded HCT Group subsidiary CT Plus a contract to operate route 394 from 3 May 2003. Upon being re-tendered, CT Plus retained the route with a new contract commencing on 1 May 2010. At the same time, the route was extended to Homerton and the vehicles on the route changed to low-floor Dennis Dart SLFs. The frequency of the route was increased; from initially using just two vehicles, it now requires 10 buses.

In October 2009, a baby was born on a bus operating route 394. The baby was given the middle name Dennis after the manufacturer of the bus.

On 29 April 2017, route 394 was retained by HCT Group with a new fleet of Alexander Dennis Enviro200 MMC buses introduced.

On 27th August 2022, route 394 was included in the sale of HCT Group's ‘red bus’ operations to Stagecoach London.

Current route
Route 394 operates via these primary locations:
Homerton University Hospital
Hackney Central station 
Broadway Market
Haggerston Park
Hoxton
Shoreditch Park
Angel station 
Islington Tolpuddle Street

Route 394 links the busy boroughs of Hackney and Islington, and visits the culturally significant areas of London Fields and Hoxton. Its route was featured in Time Out London magazine in March 2009.

References

External links

394 bus route - Transport for London

Bus routes in London
Transport in the London Borough of Hackney
Transport in the London Borough of Tower Hamlets
Transport in the London Borough of Islington